Prof. Darbari Lal is an Indian politician from the state of Punjab. He served as the Deputy Speaker of the Punjab Legislative Assembly from 12 July 2004 to 10 March 2007.

Constituency
He represented the Amritsar central assembly constituency from 1980 to 1992 and 2002 to 2007.

Political Party  
He represented the Indian National Congress but in 2014 he joined the Bharatiya Janata Party.

References 

Living people
People from Punjab, India
Bharatiya Janata Party politicians from Punjab
Year of birth missing (living people)